The Chicago Packer (1899–1910) was a weekly newspaper published in the early 20th century which catered to the interests of commercial growers, produce handlers, and poultry farmers. It devoted to fruits, vegetables, butter, eggs and poultry. Specifically published out Chicago, Illinois as an edition of the Kansas City Packer there were other editions published out of New York City, New York, Cincinnati, Ohio, and Los Angeles, California.

References

External links
 Illinois Digital Newspaper Collections: Chicago Packer (1907-1939)

Defunct newspapers published in Chicago
1899 establishments in Illinois
1910 establishments in Illinois
Weekly newspapers published in the United States